Laura Molina (born December 11, 1986) is a beach volleyball player from El Salvador, who represents her native country at the 2007 Pan American Games in Rio de Janeiro, Brazil. She also represented her home country at the 2006 Central American and Caribbean Games in Cartagena, Colombia, partnering Diana Romero.

She also played at the NORCECA Beach Volleyball Circuit in 2007, 2008 and 2009.

References

External links 
 
 Norceca
 

1986 births
Living people
Salvadoran beach volleyball players
Women's beach volleyball players
Pan American Games competitors for El Salvador
Beach volleyball players at the 2007 Pan American Games
Beach volleyball players at the 2015 Pan American Games
Competitors at the 2006 Central American and Caribbean Games